The 1976–77 season was the 97th season of competitive football by Rangers.

Overview
Rangers played a total of 54 competitive matches during the 1976–77 season.

Results
All results are written with Rangers' score first.

Scottish Premier Division

European Cup

Scottish Cup

League Cup

Non-competitive

Tennent Caledonian Cup

Appearances

League table

See also
 1976–77 in Scottish football
 1976–77 Scottish Cup
 1976–77 Scottish League Cup
 1976–77 European Cup

References 

Rangers F.C. seasons
Rangers
Rangers